Kersley Levrai (born June 21, 1981) is a Mauritian football player who currently plays for AS de Vacoas-Phoenix in the Mauritian Premier League and for the Mauritius national football team as a defender.

References 

1981 births
Living people
Mauritius international footballers
Mauritian footballers
Association football defenders